Manassas Station Operations refer to three battles at Manassas, Virginia during the American Civil War:

First Battle of Bull Run
Manassas Station Operations (Stonewall Jackson)
Second Battle of Bull Run